The Khandeyar are one of the two groups of the Nenets.  They are also known as Forest Nenets or Forest Yurak because they live in the forest region or Taiga instead of the Tundra like the other Nenets.

The Khandeyar speak the Forest variety of Nenets.

Sources
Wixman, Ronald. The People of the USSR: An Ethnographic Handbook, (Armonk: M. E. Sharpe, 1984) p. 102

Ethnic groups in Russia